John 3 is the third chapter of the Gospel of John in the New Testament of the Christian Bible. It deals with Jesus' conversation with Nicodemus, one of the Jewish pharisees, and John the Baptist's continued testimony regarding Jesus. Baptist preacher Charles Spurgeon said of this chapter that it is the chapter he would choose "to read to a dying man who did not know the gospel, [as] the most suitable one for such an occasion".

Text
The original text was written in Koine Greek. This chapter is divided into 36 verses.

Textual witnesses
Some early manuscripts containing the text of this chapter are: 
Papyrus 75 (AD 175–225)
Papyrus 66 (c. 200)
Codex Vaticanus (325-350)
Codex Sinaiticus (330-360)
Codex Bezae (c. 400; extant verses 27–36)
Codex Alexandrinus (400-440)
Codex Ephraemi Rescriptus (c. 450; extant verses 34–36)
Papyrus 63 (c. 500; extant verses 14–18)

Discourse with Nicodemus (3:1-21)

The first part of the chapter begins with Nicodemus, said to be a member of the ruling council, coming at night to talk with Jesus, whom he calls Rabbi. On account of Jesus' "miraculous signs", Nicodemus and others ("we" in ) have recognized that Jesus is " a teacher come from God". It is not clear for whom Nicodemus speaks – the translation in The Voice adds wording, "Teacher, some of us have been talking ..." – but many commentators infer from the nighttime setting for this meeting that Nicodemus came alone, privately, "through shame, and fear of his brethren of the council", shame possibly arising because, "being a master in Israel, [he would not want] to be looked upon as a scholar going to learn of another". Methodist writer Joseph Benson notes, with support, theologian Daniel Whitby's interpretation, that "the Pharisees and rulers knew Christ to be a teacher come from God".

In reply Jesus declared, "I tell you the truth, no one can see the kingdom of God unless he is born from above, or born again." The word in  may be translated as either "again" or "from above". The King James Version, the English Standard Version and the New International Version all say "born again", whereas the New Revised Standard Version and Young's Literal Translation both have "born from above" in their text with an alternative note "born anew". Nicodemus's reply, "How can someone be born when they are old? Surely they cannot enter a second time into their mother's womb to be born!" reflects an understanding that Jesus is speaking of a second birth. Jesus then talks of what it means to be born again and the path to heaven. "I tell you the truth, no one can enter the kingdom of God unless he is born of water and the Spirit. Flesh gives birth to flesh, but the Spirit gives birth to spirit." (5-6)

Verse 7

Theologian Donald Guthrie states that this verse gives emphasis to 'the imperative character of the new birth', with 'nothing optional about it'.

Verse 14

"Be lifted up": (especially  in the Gospel of John) refers to 'one continuous action of ascent, beginning with the cross but ending at the right hand of the Father', in three steps: (1) Jesus’ death on the cross, (2) his resurrection, and (3) his ascension back to heaven (cf. Philippians 2:5-11; John 1:51; 12:32).

Verse 16

This chapter is intended to show the importance of the belief in Jesus as the son of God. Jesus is shown here already proclaiming himself the Messiah and laying out aspects of Christian theology, in contrast to Mark for instance, where Jesus seems to try to keep the fact of his divinity secret until his final trip to Jerusalem.

Nicodemus appears here, in chapter  and is listed in John , and only in the Gospel of John, as helping Joseph of Arimathea to bury Jesus.

Jesus baptizes (3:22-36)
In the second part of the chapter, Jesus goes with his disciples into the land of Judea, the region round about Jerusalem, presumably towards the River Jordan, and remains there and baptizes. John the Baptist is also baptizing people nearby, at Aenon, near Salim, because water was abundant there, and people continued coming for baptism.

John's disciples tell him that Jesus is also baptizing people, more than John it seems (: "everybody is going to Him"). John replies that "A man can receive only what is given him from heaven. You yourselves can testify that I said, 'I am not the Christ, but am sent ahead of him'. The bride belongs to the bridegroom. The friend who attends the bridegroom waits and listens for him, and is full of joy when he hears the bridegroom's voice. That joy is mine, and it is now complete. He must become greater; I must become less." He finishes by saying "Whoever believes in the Son has eternal life, but whoever rejects the Son will not see life, for God's wrath remains on him." This passage is meant to show John's acceptance of Jesus's superiority as well as a further emphasis on belief in him as the path to eternal life/heaven. There is an ethnoreligious group still surviving today, the Mandaeans, who claim John as the greatest prophet.

Verse 36
He who believes in the Son has everlasting life; and he who does not believe the Son shall not see life, but the wrath of God abides on him.
In the parallel passage containing the preaching of John the Baptist in Matthew's Gospel, condemnation is directed towards the Pharisees and the Sadducees, who are challenged to "bear fruits worthy of repentance".

Use of verses from John 3
Biblical references for verses John 3:7 and John 3:16 are both used in signage and popular culture to communicate the message of the Christian gospel.

See also
 Fiery flying serpent
 Moses
 Nehushtan
Related Bible parts: Numbers 21, Hosea 1

References

Sources

Further reading
 Brown, Raymond E., An Introduction to the New Testament Doubleday 1997 
 John 3 NIV

External links
 King James Bible - Wikisource
English Translation with Parallel Latin Vulgate 
Online Bible at GospelHall.org (ESV, KJV, Darby, American Standard Version, Bible in Basic English)
Multiple bible versions at Bible Gateway (NKJV, NIV, NRSV etc.)

 
John 03
Pharisees
Nicodemus